Dakona was a Canadian alternative rock music group from Vancouver, British Columbia.

History

Dakona formed in 1997 in Vancouver. The group was made up of lead vocalist and songwriter Ryan McAllister, Shane Dueck on bass and as co-songwriter, Brook Winstanley on guitar and John Biondillo on drums. The band began by performing locally in Vancouver, and independently released two albums.

In 2003 The band signed with Maverick Records, recorded an album, Perfect Change, and toured in the US to promote it. The album received mediocre reviews.

Maverick later dissolved. Dakona disbanded in 2005. Since then, Ryan McAllister has released two solo albums, "Sketches" and "Music For a Rainy Town", and has played with the band North Country Gentlemen (formerly known as Cowboys and Indians).

Discography
1998: Good Enough for Me (independent)
2000: Ordinary Heroes (independent)

References

Musical groups established in 1997
Musical groups disestablished in 2004
Musical groups from Vancouver
Canadian Christian rock groups
1997 establishments in British Columbia
2004 disestablishments in British Columbia